The Princeton Triangle Club is a theater troupe at Princeton University. Founded in 1891, it is one of the oldest collegiate theater troupes in the United States.  Triangle 
premieres an original student-written musical every year, and then takes that show on a national tour. The club is known for its signature kickline; historically performed by the men of the ensemble in drag, the kickline has recently featured both all-female and co-ed casts.

The troupe presents several shows throughout the year. In September at the end of the University's Freshman Week, the Club presents its "Frosh Week Show", a revue of popular material from previous years. In the autumn it premieres the year's new Triangle Show, an original student-written musical comedy, professionally directed and choreographed and performed in McCarter Theatre;  this Triangle Show goes on a national tour in January.  In spring, the Club showcases the new writers' material in a smaller campus venue.  And during reunions after the end of the spring semester, the year's Triangle Show plays its final performances at McCarter.

Among the club's notable alumni are F. Scott Fitzgerald, Booth Tarkington, Russel Wright, Joshua Logan, Brooks Bowman, Jimmy Stewart, José Ferrer, Wayne Rogers, Clark Gesner, Jeff Moss, David E. Kelley, Nicholas Hammond, Zachary Pincus-Roth, and Brooke Shields.

History
The history of the Princeton Triangle Club reflects many major social, cultural, economic, political, literary and theatrical trends in the United States during the late 19th and 20th centuries. It also traces the evolution of both undergraduate life and theatrical endeavors at Princeton University. In its century-plus of productions, Triangle has commented upon Princeton-specific topics, from examinations and campus safety to the Honor Code and the eating clubs, in addition to broader movements and events, including war protests, political scandals, women's rights, and affirmative action. Although Triangle essentially recreates itself every year with an entirely new, full-scale musical-comedy, the club remains committed to its longstanding traditions, from the annual national tour to the kickline, and perpetuates its unique spirit, blending topical humor with collegiate irreverence and outright playfulness.

Triangle's history is documented in several ways. The Long Kickline: A History of the Princeton Triangle Club, written in 1968 by Donald Marsden '64, provides a detailed chronology of the organization through the production of Sham on Wry in 1966–67. The senior thesis of Nancy Barnes ’91, One Hundred Years and Still Kicking: A History of the Princeton Triangle Club, updates this written record. Finally, Triangle's extensive archives in Princeton's Mudd Library include playbills, musical scores, scripts, reviews, photographs, business correspondence, tour itineraries, scrapbooks, recordings, and much more.

Beginnings

The Triangle Club archives begin in 1883 with a production of the Princeton College Dramatic Association; during the next five years the Association presented a number of plays. In keeping with the practice of British and American all-male institutions at the time, women's roles were played by men. Entr'acte music, provided by the Instrumental or Banjo Clubs, consisted of popular dance tunes or operatic excerpts. Student theatricals were performed for the benefit of financially ailing athletic associations, and the sporadic activity of the Dramatic Association can be explained by the fluctuating fortunes of the sports teams.

In 1891 the Dramatic Association joined forces with the University Glee Club to present Po-ca-hon-tas, the first show in the Triangle tradition of musicals written and produced by students. According to a New York review, the reworked John Brougham play featured "new topical songs and local hits" and was well received, both on campus and in a Trenton performance. But the faculty vetoed a proposed New York performance, and over the years, students and administrators would often be at odds over theatrical activities. Nevertheless, the Association visited Trenton once again the following year with Katharine, a Shakespearean spoof marking the first appearance of Booth Tarkington 1893 in the Triangle records.

The 1893 production, The Honorable Julius Caesar, was again a reworking of Shakespeare. Tarkington, a senior and president of the Dramatic Association, was prominent as both co-author of the book and as actor in the role of Cassius. The show was so successful that it was repeated the following year, with several significant changes. Most importantly, the Princeton University Dramatic Association had been renamed the Triangle Club of Princeton. According to a preview in The New York Times, "several specialties will be introduced, such as tumbling, acrobatic feats, and dancing" and "James E. Wilson of Frohman's company... will coach the club regularly four times a week." If Wilson did indeed coach, the club had its first professional director in its very first show under the name "Triangle."

Early growth

Financial problems caused Club members to curtail expenses in 1895. Neither the February production, Who's Who, nor the May offering, Snowball, were written by students, and both had relatively small casts. The following year the Club turned to a recent graduate, Post Wheeler '91, in hopes that his magic touch as co-author of The Honorable Julius Caesar could be repeated, and they were pleased with the result. The Mummy (1895–96) was also notable as the first production in Triangle's new home, the Casino, located on the lower campus near the present-day McCarter Theatre site. Yet another innovation was attempted in 1897. A Tiger Lily, the first Triangle show to be based on Princeton student life, was part of a double bill with Lend Me Five Shillings, a British farce. Since neither show was a great success, the Club returned to the tried and true in 1898 with a revival of Po-ca-hon-tas. The Privateer, presented in 1899, was originally entitled The Captain's Kidd Sister, but the name was changed because the University of Pennsylvania's Mask and Wig Club had already produced a show about Captain Kidd. The "Privateer March" was the first commercially published Triangle song.

Traditions begin

In 1901, with The King of Pomeru, Triangle ventured for the first time to New York, and the next year the club ventured as far as Pittsburgh. After the 1901 New York performance, Franklin B. Morse 1895 proposed a meeting to organize Triangle alumni, who he believed could help promote the club, build its reputation, arrange the annual tour, collect materials and memorabilia, and generally socialize among themselves. In June of that year, thirty-seven alumni met in Princeton, and the Triangle Board of Trustees was established.

During the first decade of the 20th century, the organization of Triangle became increasingly structured. Printed copies of the script, "for the exclusive use of candidates," first appear in the archives with The Man From Where (1903–04).

Although A Woodland Wedding (1899–1900) included a specialty skirt dance, and "The Pony Ballet" was a part of Tabasco Land (1905–06), The Mummy Monarch'''s kickline in 1907 was the first of that tradition to be documented photographically in the Triangle Archives.

Budding fame and higher standards

By 1910 the tour had extended as far west as Chicago and St. Louis; printed luncheon menus and newspaper clippings provide evidence of the elaborate social functions that were becoming part of the annual trek. With Once in a Hundred Years (1912–13), Triangle moved its tour to the Christmas season, again traveling as far west as St. Louis. The following year, President and Mrs. Wilson attended The Pursuit of Priscilla’s Washington matinee performance; the First Family then hosted a reception for Triangle at the White House.The Evil Eye (1915-16) had a distinguished pair of neophyte authors: Edmund Wilson '16 wrote the book, and F. Scott Fitzgerald '17 was responsible for the lyrics. Although he was never a cast member in a Triangle production, Fitzgerald wrote three shows for the Club between 1914 and 1917.

During 1917-18, a four man Triangle troupe toured Europe to entertain the soldiers stationed there for World War I. After the year hiatus, the club became active again with a revival of The Honorable Julius Caesar. The first post-war tour occurred when The Isle of Surprise was taken on the road during Christmas break of 1919. This show marked a change in attitude toward Triangle productions. In the program, Club president Erdman Harris '20 described the new production: "We hope that a new day has dawned, that ‘Jazz’ will be forever relegated to a back seat, that Broadway will cease to be the idol of those who create the shows, that their staging shall be done in Princeton by Princeton men, and that the authorities and graduates will approve what is being done to elevate the standard of a society whose value in student life has been seriously questioned."

In the spring of 1922, Triangle staged George Bernard Shaw's The Devil's Disciple. This production marked a milepost in the Club's history, for its three female roles were actually played by women.  Sets for this production were designed and painted by Russel Wright during his freshman year, marking one of the few times that a freshman was ever allowed to join Triangle.

Professionalization and emerging stars

During the early 1920s, New York performances began to be booked at the Metropolitan Opera House, although initially there was some concern whether the Club would be able to fill such a large theatre and whether the men's voices would be strong enough to be heard properly.  Late in 1923, there were negotiations concerning a possible radio broadcast, and in the same year Triangle's music publisher, J. Church Co., corresponded with the Victor Talking Machine Co. about a trial recording. But the major event during this decade was the planning and construction of McCarter Theatre for Triangle Club. The completed theatre opened on February 21, 1930, with the Triangle Club's The Golden Dog. McCarter replaced the long-controversial Casino, which burned on January 8, 1924.

Here began the Golden Period for which the Triangle Club became famous, in terms of its eventual contribution of outstanding talent to the Broadway theatre and Hollywood. Within a few years the Club would send forth into these professional realms Erik Barnouw '29; C. Norris Houghton, Joshua Logan, and Myron McCormick, all Class of 1931; James Stewart '32; José Ferrer '33; and Nick Foran '34.

The 1935 show, Stags at Bay, featured "East of the Sun (and West of the Moon)," written by Brooks Bowman, which would become the most popular and longest-lasting national hit ever to come out of the Triangle Club. Recorded by Frank Sinatra and Louis Armstrong, among many others, "East of the Sun" still provides the club with royalties.  Other songs from the same show, by Bowman, included "Love and Dime" and "Will Love find a Way?."

Difficulties in the Depression years

With The Tiger Smiles (1930–31), Triangle writers returned to a Princeton town and gown setting for the first time since When Congress Came to Princeton (1908–09). The production was well received, but the club was already beginning to feel the effects of the Great Depression. In October 1930, the Program Manager reported, "Due to the financial depression, the business of getting ads is a rather difficult one just now." By the following year economic conditions had begun to affect the tour. South Orange reported poor ticket sales, and the local alumni chairman was concerned with keeping down the cost of stagehands; in Pittsburgh, a poor house and lack of entertainment were attributed to the weak stock market. When It's the Valet (1932–33) was ready to tour, local alumni groups were either unwilling to sponsor a show or unable to guarantee an adequate sum to cover expenses, let alone show a profit. The club's Graduate Board sought aid from alumni in underwriting the show, but individual contributions were equally difficult to come by.

Throughout the mid-thirties, Triangle continued to tour in spite of the Depression, but there were rumblings of discontent from both the Graduate Board of the Club and the University administration. In a 1934 meeting with President Dodds, the Board indicated concern about the financial condition of McCarter Theatre; Triangle profits were insufficient to keep McCarter operating in the black, a situation that would become increasingly serious as the decade wore on. President Dodds had also heard alumni criticism about poor acting and an apparent lack of coaching in connection with the latest show. Yet he remained confident that Triangle could play an important role on campus. Later that year, Club Manager Stryker Warren '35 received a stern letter from Dean of the College Christian Gauss. Gauss had considered canceling the Christmas tour, first because of financial considerations, and then because of alumni criticism, which "in nearly every case... came as the result of the excessive drinking on the part of a few of your men." Nevertheless, the Dean concluded by wishing "you and all the officers and members of the Club a highly successful trip, a very merry Christmas and a happy New Year."

At a 1937 Board meeting there was discussion about the lack of good voices in Triangle. Alumni as well as Board members had noted this situation, and it was suggested that "there must be someone in the Glee Club who could at least be drafted to sing, so that a song could be heard beyond the footlights." Another complaint came from a Louisville alumnus early in 1938, who wrote, "I am not crazy about the Triangle Club bringing in certain dirty lines about ‘buying a drink’ and ‘the Knights of the Garter,’ etc..... Personally I would prefer to see the young men get properly soused and have to be poured on the train than to use [these] lines."

Another change in tradition came during the 1941-42 academic year, when Triangle produced Ask Me Another, its first show in revue format. Then, at a Board meeting in September 1943, Graduate Treasurer B. Franklin Bunn '07 announced that there would be no Triangle Club activities for the duration of the war. The University assumed control of McCarter Theatre during this period, and the building was leased by the military for trainees’ use on campus.

Post-war comeback

In November 1945, the University Committee on Undergraduate Activities issued a report describing Triangle as "perhaps the most controversial of all undergraduate extracurricular activities. Despite obvious shortcomings, the Club affords many valuable opportunities to the undergraduate body and plays a very real part in alumni relations. According, it should be reestablished at the first possible moment." The first post-war show, Clear the Track, opened in December 1946 and even managed a seven-city tour. But Triangle was beset with problems the following year for All Rights Reserved (1947–48). The Daily Princetonian reported, "All Rights pretty nearly weren't reserved. A play by the same name had fizzled on Broadway for a bare month, in 1934, and the petulant playwright threatened to sue. Hasty consultation with a Broadway lawyer revealed that the author could not possibly win the suit and that matter was closed." The club resolved tricky labor questions by employing union stagehands and music-hirelings, putting the later to work first in Philadelphia, where they were made to earn their fee by playing with the regular orchestra, and then in Washington, where they provided the intermission music.

Despite ongoing debate in the 1950s about the club's obligations to theatrical professionalism, as well as its questionable effect on the University's reputation, Triangle continued to reach a wider audience through greater media exposure. In 1948, All in Favor was broadcast on WNBC-TV, becoming the first college show to appear on the new medium of television. The entire score of Too Hot for Toddy (1950–51) was recorded, and members of the cast appeared on The Kate Smith Show and Ed Sullivan's The Toast of the Town. Club productions appeared on The Ed Sullivan Show from 1950 to 1957; its host wrote to Triangle President Charles Robinson, "The Princeton Triangle Club has an annual appointment on our stage, so long as I'm on TV."

Finally, in 1953, a memorandum of agreement was drawn up between Princeton University and the Trustees of the Triangle Club abrogating the McCarter agreement of the 1920s. The club had simply been unable to cover the operating expenses and pay the taxes of the Theatre. A full-time general manager was hired for McCarter, and the University, which had been underwriting Triangle's losses, agreed to cancel the club's debts.

The Lyon eraSpree de Corps (1955–56) marked the debut of Milton Lyon as Triangle director. From 1955 until his death forty years later, Lyon would direct all but a handful of Triangle's original productions.

Student apathy toward extracurricular activities began to affect Triangle toward the end of the 1950s. At a meeting in October 1958, the Board noted a very small turnout for the previous month's auditions. It was decided that more on-campus publicity would help, and as part of this effort Triangle Junior was formed, a group of seven club members who performed favorite Triangle songs at various receptions and functions. Over the following years, this small group would undergo periodic name changes, being known as Triangle Ding! and Triangle Bit Parts before returning to Ding!, as it is called today.

With the gradual elimination of passenger trains in the late 1950s, the club began touring by bus. Early in 1960 there was a proposal to produce a motion picture on the Triangle Club, but a Hollywood writers' strike and possible heavy expenses brought an end to this publicity idea. However, Triangle did embark on its first European tour that summer; the Club performed Breakfast in Bedlam (1959–60) at French and German bases of the American army. Tour de Farce (1961–62) became perhaps the most widely toured show: performances in Pasadena and San Francisco marked the first time the show had been seen live on both coasts, and then troupe members again went to Europe that summer to perform at US Army bases.Funny Side Up (1963–64) was billed as the 75th anniversary show in spite of the fact that number seventy was Tour de Farce, produced only two years earlier. Funny Side Up did not have a smooth start: the writers were slow to produce material, and the trustees even considered the possibility that there would be no show. Because of the diamond jubilee, twenty-one songs from earlier shows were made a part of the program. The tour of Funny Side Up included several southern stops, and the Birmingham visit became problematic when Triangle was booked into a segregated theatre. After some strongly worded letters from Board members, it was determined that the performance would either be cancelled or moved to a non-segregated house.

Coeducation and other changesA Different Kick (1968–69) was a Triangle milestone, featuring the first female undergraduate to be cast in a Club show—Sue Jean Lee '70, a junior in the Critical Languages Program. The University's shift to coeducation the next fall would have a profound effect on Triangle. Call a Spade a Shovel (1969–1970) featured six women in a seventeen-member cast. The social and political commentary of the show, most especially its anti-Vietnam War tones, which reflected the views of the Vietnam Veteran who was president and much of the country, unleashed an unprecedented storm of alumni protest and caused a mass audience walk-out at the Grosse Pointe tour performance.

This incident, along with growing budgetary and logistical concerns, caused the Board of Trustees to revise its production schedule. As per the May 1970 Report of the Board's New Directions Committee, there was to be neither a December show nor a Christmas tour; instead, a spring show was promised, to be followed by a short tour. Cracked Ice opened in April 1971, was repeated for alumni in June, but did finally tour the following December. To cut expenses, the cast and crew stayed in private homes rather than hotels, and non-union halls were booked.

The Princeton Triangle Workshop made its debut in November 1972 with a presentation of The Fantasticks at the Princeton Inn Theater; the following March the Workshop produced Transitions, described as "five original plays and a multimedia extravaganza," in Wilcox Hall. This began a 25-year tradition of smaller fall productions to complement the full-scale, original spring shows. The fall productions of 1978, Happily Ever After, and 1979, String of Pearls, were both written by undergraduates. For the 1981 spring show, Triangle writers returned to the very roots of the club and based their book musical, Bold Type, on Booth Tarkington's novel, A Gentleman from Indiana.

The 1981 tour again returned to California, but with a revue of Triangle favorites, Fool's Gold, rather than the spring show. The following year Triangle hired Miriam Fond, the first female director in the club's history. Triangle finally found a permanent home for its fall productions when The Best Little Whorehouse in Texas opened at the Triangle Broadmead Theatre in November 1984. In the 1980s, the club began to present produce revues of the best of Triangle early in the fall to introduce the freshman class to the organization.

Centennial

The club's centennial was celebrated in 1991 with a series of campus events throughout the year, including the spring show entitled The Older, the Better, a large Firestone Library exhibition of more than 850 items from the Triangle Archives, and a fall reunion weekend of parties and performances. But how could the centennial celebration be held in 1991 when the fiftieth anniversary show was Once Over Lightly, produced in 1938-39? After much debate, it had been decided that the first show in the true Triangle tradition of original work was Po-ca-hon-tas in 1891; hence the choice of 1991 for the one-hundredth anniversary.

The 2nd century

In the late 1990s, the production schedule reverted to its original calendar, in which the new Triangle Show premiered at McCarter in the fall of each academic year, followed in winter by that show's tour. This change meant that in 1997-1998 the Club needed to generate two-full length musicals in fifteen months, almost twice the writing load of previous years. In September 1997, Triangle began a writing workshop to coordinate the efforts of the writers; this program was enormously successful, producing In Lava and War in April 1998 and 101 Damnations in November 1998. By the spring of 1999, the corps of 21 writers had been so prolific that Triangle presented an extra, original spring show at Theatre Intime, entitled The Rude Olympics. The 1999–2000 season saw the hundredth anniversary of the kickline in The Blair Arch Project (November 1999), as well as Triangle's return to Theatre Intime in May with The Rude Olympics II: American Booty. Puns of Steel (2000–2001) became the first Club show to record its score on a CD.

Recent developments

The Club's current calendar continues the production schedule begun in the 1990s, with the Frosh Week Show presented during the first week of classes, the new Triangle Show premiering at McCarter Theatre in November, the Club's national tour in late January, a spring showcase of new writers' material in April/May, and the Triangle Show's encore performance at McCarter for Reunions.  

Recent years have seen the refinement of the club's infrastructure, with continued development of the writing workshop and the shaping of a more active business team under the name "TriBiz."  

The Club continues to receive a high level of regional recognition, with the 2007 Triangle Show A Turnpike Runs Through It appearing in The New York Times.  Turnpike also marked the first collaboration of a creative team composed largely of Club alumni with extensive experience in NY professional theater:  Glen Pannell '87 (director), Hans Kriefall '87 (choreographer), Pete Mills '95 (music director) and David Kaley '97 (costumer).  This team collaborated on a string of well-received productions over the next decade, highlighting the Club's commitment to a professional aesthetic in showcasing ever more ambitious work from the Writers' Workshop.

Notable cast members and contributors
 Booth Tarkington 1893
 F. Scott Fitzgerald 1917
 Russel Wright '21 and '22
 Joshua Logan '31
 James Stewart '32
 José Ferrer '34
 Brooks Bowman '36
 Bo Goldman '53
 Wayne Rogers '56
 Clark Gesner '60
 Jeff Moss '63
 A. Scott Berg '71
 David E. Kelley '79
 Cecil Hoffman '84
 Louis Bayard '85
 Brooke Shields '87
 Ellie Kemper '02
 Michael Yang '04
 Molly Ephraim '08

History of shows
Academic Year / Show (if more than one show listed, the first is the Mainstage Show) 
1890-1891 Po-ca-hon-tas, or The Gentle Savage''  
1891-1892 Katharine  
1892-1893 The Honorable Julius Caesar  
1893-1894 The Honorable Julius Caesar  
1894-1895 Snowball; Who's Who  
1895-1896 The Mummy  
1896-1897 Lend Me Five Shillings; A Tiger Lily  
1897-1898 Po-ca-hon-tas, or The Gentle Savage  
1898-1899 The Privateer, or The Pirates of Pennsnec  
1899-1900 A Woodland Wedding  
1900-1901 The King of Pomeru  
1901-1902 The King of Pomeru  
1902-1903 The Mullah of Miasma  
1903-1904 The Man From Where  
1904-1905 The Pretenders  
1905-1906 Tabasco Land  
1906-1907 The Mummy Monarch  
1907-1908 When Congress Went to Princeton  
1908-1909 The Duchess of Bluffshire  
1909-1910 His Honor the Sultan  
1910-1911 Simply Cynthia  
1911-1912 Main Street  
1912-1913 Once in a Hundred Years  
1913-1914 The Pursuit of Priscilla  
1914-1915 Fie! Fie! Fi-Fi!  
1915-1916 The Evil Eye  
1916-1917 Safety First  
1917-1918 (a four-man troupe entertained troops in Europe) 
1918-1919 The Honorable Julius Caesar  
1919-1920 The Isle of Surprise  
1920-1921 They Never Come Back  
1921-1922 Espanola; The Devil's Disciple  
1922-1923 The Man From Earth  
1923-1924 Drake's Drum  
1924-1925 The Scarlet Coat  
1925-1926 Fortuno  
1926-1927 Samarkand; Captain Applejack  
1927-1928 Napoleon Passes  
1928-1929 Zuider Zee  
1929-1930 The Golden Dog; The Second Man  
1930-1931 The Tiger Smiles  
1931-1932 Spanish Blades  
1932-1933 It's the Valet; Private Lives  
1933-1934 Fiesta; Goodbye Again  
1934-1935 Stags at Bay (incl. East of the Sun (and West of the Moon)); Holiday  
1935-1936 What a Relief!  
1936-1937 Take It Away  
1937-1938 Fol-de-Rol  
1938-1939 Once Over Lightly; Spring Shambles  
1939-1940 Any Moment Now  
1940-1941 Many A Slip  
1941-1942 Ask Me Another 
1942-1943 Time and Again  
1943-1944 (no show, due to World War II)  
1944-1945 (no show, due to World War II)  
1945-1946 (no show, due to World War II)  
1946-1947 Clear the Track  
1947-1948 All Rights Reserved  
1948-1949 All in Favor  
1949-1950 Come Across  
1950-1951 Too Hot for Toddy  
1951-1952 Never Say Horses  
1952-1953 Ham 'n Legs  
1953-1954 Malice in Wonderland  
1954-1955 Tunis, Anyone?  
1955-1956 Spree de Corps  
1956-1957 Take a Gander  
1957-1958 After a Fashion  
1958-1959 For Heaven's Sake  
1959-1960 Breakfast in Bedlam  
1960-1961 Midsummer Night Scream; Guys and Dolls  
1961-1962 Tour de Farce  
1962-1963 Ahead of the Game  
1963-1964 Funny Side Up  
1964-1965 Grape Expectations  
1965-1966 High Sobriety  
1966-1967 Sham on Wry  
1967-1968 Enter Venus  
1968-1969 A Different Kick  
1969-1970 Call a Spade a Shovel; '70 Minutes  
1970-1971 Cracked Ice  
1971-1972 Blue Genes; One More Hour for Uncle Ben  
1972-1973 Future Schlock  
1973-1974 A Titter Ran Through the Audience  
1974-1975 American Zucchini; Blithe Spirit  
1975-1976 Mugs Money  
1976-1977 Kafka, Tea or Me  
1977-1978 Chile Today, Guacamole  
1978-1979 Academia Nuts; Happily Ever After  
1979-1980 From Here to Hilarity; String of Pearls  
1980-1981 Bold Type and Company 
1981-1982 Stocks and Bondage and Cabaret; Fool's Gold: 85 Minutes of the Best of Triangle  
1982-1983 Under the Influence; Merrily We Roll Along  
1983-1984 Revel Without a Pause; Three Penny Opera  
1984-1985 No. 96-Untitled; The Best Little Whorehouse in Texas  
1985-1986 Star Spangled Banter; The Boy Friend  
1986-1987 Business Unusual; Applause; 90 Minutes of the Best of Triangle  
1987-1988 Ain't Mythbehavin'; No Strings; 91 Minutes of the Best of Triangle  
1988-1989 Satanic Nurses; Little Shop of Horrors  
1989-1990 Easy Street  
1990-1991 The Older, the Better; Into the Woods; 94 Minutes of the Best of Triangle 
1991-1992 Do-Re-Media;The Centennial Revue: "100 Years and Still Kicking";95 Minutes of the Best of Triangle  
1992-1993 Shelf Indulgence; A Funny Thing Happened on the Way to the Forum; 96 Minutes of the Best of Triangle  
1993-1994 Bermuda Love Triangle; 97 Minutes of the Best of Triangle  
1994-1995 Rhyme and Punishment; 98 Minutes of the Best of Triangle  
1995-1996 Pulpit Fiction  
1996-1997 The Tiger Roars; It's a Wonderful Laugh  
1997-1998 In Lava and War  
1998-1999 101 Damnations; The Rude Olympics; Palindromes are Fun!  
1999-2000 The Blair Arch Project; The Rude Olympics II: American Booty; Menage '03  
2000-2001 Puns of Steel; 2004Play; The Rude Olympics III  
2001-2002 Absurd to the Wise; sLAUGHTERhouse '05; The Rude Olympics IV   
2002-2003 This Side of Parody; '06 Degrees of Separation; The Rude Olympics V: Schlock & Awe  
2003-2004 For Love or Funny; '07 Deadly Sins; The Rude Olympics VI: Weapons of Mass Distraction  
2004-2005 Orange and Black to the Future; Magic '08 Balls; The Rude Olympics VII: Fondling Neverland  
2005-2006 Excess Hollywood; Love Potion '09; Rude Olympics VIII: An Eye for an iPod 
2006-2007 Heist Almighty; Crude In'10tions; Rude Olympics IX: The Devil Wears Nada 
2007-2008 A Turnpike Runs Through It: A New Jersical; Knockin' on '11's Door; Rude Olympics X: Whitman Can't Jump 
2008-2009 Stark Raven Mad; All's Well That Ends '12; WaWall-E 
2009-2010 Store Trek; A Night at the Apollo '13, Cornel West Side Story
2010-2011 Family Feudalism; Chicken Soup '14 Souls, Dial Elm for Murder
2011-2012 Doomsdays of our Lives; Freshman '15; Are You There Dod? It's Me, Marquand
2012-2013 Tree's Company (Forest's a Crowd); My Super Sweet '16; Shirley You're Joking, Mrs. Tilghman!
2013-2014 Zero Gravitas; NC-'17; Waiting for Guyot
2014-2015 An Inconvenient Sleuth; You Must Be '18 or Older to Enter; A Wrinkle Intime
2015-2016 Tropic Blunder; A '19 Shining Armor; The Forbes Awakens
2016-2017 Greece’d Lightning!; Are You Feeling '20, Too?; Manchester By The C-Store
2017-2018 Spy School Musical; '21 Pun Salute; Terrace Bueller's Day Off
2018-2019 Night of the Laughing Dead; You're a Catch, '22!; McCosh Me If You Can
2019-2020 Once Uponzi Time; ‘23 and Me; Blairasite
2020-2021 All Underdogs Go To Heaven; The '24ce Awakens

Club Presidents
Academic Year / Name
2019 Kirsten Traudt
2020 John McEnany
 2021 Regan McCall

References

External links
Official website

Triangle Club
Theatre companies in New Jersey
Student theatre